The Cogâlnic (also Cogîlnic, Kogylnik, Kogîlnic, Kohylnyk, or Kunduk) is a 243 km river in Moldova and south-western Ukraine.

The Cogâlnic rises in the hills of Nisporeni District in the Codri region west of the Moldovan capital, Chișinău. It flows through the cities of Hîncești, Cimișlia and Basarabeasca, and then into the Budjak, past Artsyz and into the Prichernomorskoy lowlands of the Odessa Oblast (province) of Ukraine. Together with the Sarata River it enters the Sasyk Liman and thence into the Black Sea.

History
Johann Thunmann in his eighteenth century work described it:
In warm months, there is a great shortage of water. Even the largest river in this area, the Kogylnik, then dries, and it is often due to lack of water that the livestock of the Tatars die from thirst. In the autumn, when the rainy season starts, there appear suddenly appear countless streams across the low country. All of the marshes are then covered with puddles. To overcome the water shortages suffered in the summer, one finds very deep wells have been dug everywhere.  Among the Tatars, as in the east, digging wells has become an act of religion and honor.

Notes

References
Brezianu, Andrei and Spânu, Vlad (eds.) (2007) "Cogâlnic/Kogâlnic" Historical Dictionary of Moldova (2nd ed.) Scarecrow Press, Lanham, Maryland, USA, p. 92, 

Rivers of Odesa Oblast
Rivers of Moldova
International rivers of Europe
Tributaries of the Black Sea